Bill Punton is the name of:

Bill Punton (footballer, born 1934), Scottish footballer
Bill Punton (footballer, born 1957), English footballer
Bill Puntton, Dad (Musician, born 1996), Australian Musician